The Shirley Scott Trio (also referred to as Moodsville Volume 5) is an album by organist Shirley Scott recorded in 1960 and released on the Moodsville label. The album features a trio session from 1958 with Scott overdubbed on piano from the sessions that produced Scottie and another from 1960.

Reception
The Allmusic review stated "These are mostly easygoing standards of the Rodgers-Hart variety (two of that team's songs are covered), and is too much on the sedate side to rate as one of her finest efforts".

Track listing 
 "Sweet Lorraine" (Cliff Burwell, Mitchell Parish) - 4:31   
 "I Thought I'd Let You Know" (Cal Massey) - 4:20   
 "I Should Care" (Sammy Cahn, Axel Stordahl, Paul Weston) - 4:48   
 "Spring Is Here" (Lorenz Hart, Richard Rodgers) - 4:45   
 "I Didn't Know What Time It Was" (Hart, Rodgers) - 3:57   
 "Gee, Baby, Ain't I Good to You" (Andy Razaf, Don Redman) - 4:15   
 "Until the Real Thing Comes Along" (Sammy Cahn, Saul Chaplin, L. E. Freeman) - 5:09   
 "Lover Man" (Jimmy Davis, Roger "Ram" Ramirez, Jimmy Sherman) - 3:48
Recorded at Van Gelder Studio in Hackensack, New Jersey on October 23, 1958 (tracks 1, 3, 6 & 7) and in Englewood Cliffs, New Jersey on April 8, 1960  (tracks 2, 4, 5 & 8)

Personnel 
 Shirley Scott - organ
 George Duvivier (tracks 1, 3, 6 & 7), George Tucker (tracks 2, 4, 5 & 8) - bass
 Arthur Edgehill - drums

References 

1960 albums
Albums produced by Esmond Edwards
Albums recorded at Van Gelder Studio
Moodsville Records albums
Shirley Scott albums